Reni urban hromada is a hromada (territorial community) in Ukraine, in Izmail Raion of Odesa Oblast. The administrative center is the city of Reni. Population: 

Until 18 July 2020, the hromada belonged to Reni Raion. The raion was abolished in July 2020 as part of the administrative reform of Ukraine, which reduced the number of raions of Odesa Oblast to seven. The area of Reni Raion was merged into Izmail Raion.

Settlements 
The hromada consists of 1 city (Reni) and 7 villages: Dolynske, Kotlovyna, Lymanske, Nahirne, Novosilske, Orlivka, and Plavni.

References 

Hromadas of Odesa Oblast
2020 establishments in Ukraine